The A81 autoroute is a motorway in north-western France. It forms the first part of a long-term project to upgrade the road connection between Le Mans and Brest to motorway standard throughout. Until 1982 the motorway was known as the F11. The A81 is a part of European route E50 linking Brest to Makhachkala in Russia.

Section completed:
 Le Mans - La Gravelle (managed by Cofiroute)
Sections not yet upgraded: 
 N157: La Gravelle - Rennes
 N12: Rennes - Brest

Itinerary

 A11 autoroute interchange  
 Rest areas: La Landrière (westbound), La Chevallerie (eastbound)  
 Rest areas: Les Gripperies (westbound), La Coire (eastbound)  
 Exit 1 (27 km): for Sillé-le-Guillaume, Sablé-sur-Sarthe, Joué-en-Charnie  
 Service areas: Saint-Denis d'Orques (westbound), Thorigné-en-Charnie (eastbound) 
 Exit 2 (50 km): for Évron, Vaiges  
 Rest areas: Villeray (westbound), Loriolet (eastbound)
 Service areas: Laval-Bonchamp (westbound), Laval-le-Coudray (eastbound)  
 Exit 3 (70 km): for Laval, Mayenne  
 Rest areas: La Mayenne (westbound), Château de Ricourdet (eastbound)
 Exit 4 (77 km): for Laval, Ernée, Fougères
 Rest areas: La Paplonnière (westbound), La Sorinière (eastbound)
 Exit 5 and current end of motorway (94 km): for Laval, La Gravelle, Vitré  
 Service areas (on N157): Derbée (westbound), Mondevert (eastbound)

External links 

 A81 Motorway in Saratlas

A81